Pierre Souquet-Basiège (born 18 July 1994) is a French ice dancer. With his former skating partner, Julia Wagret, he is the 2020 Winter Star silver medalist. With his former skating partner, Lorenza Alessandrini, he is the 2015 International Cup of Nice silver medalist and a two-time French national medalist. They competed in the final segment at the 2016 European Championships.

Personal life 
Pierre Souquet-Basiège was born on 18 July 1994 in Paris, France. His previously competed under the surname Souquet.

Career

Early career 
Souquet began learning to skate in 1998. He competed with Péroline Ojardias early in his ice dancing career. The two were coached by Muriel Zazoui and Romain Haguenauer in Lyon.

Partnership with Alessandrini 
By July 2014, Souquet had teamed up with Italy's Lorenza Alessandrini to compete for France. In December, the duo placed fourth at the French Championships. Making their international debut, they placed 5th at the Bavarian Open in February 2015.

Alessandrini/Souquet won their first international medal, silver, in October 2015 at the Cup of Nice, before taking silver at the French Championships in December. The following month, they competed at the 2016 European Championships in Bratislava, Slovakia. Ranked 16th in the short dance, they qualified to the free dance and finished 20th overall. They were coached by Muriel Zazoui, Olivier Schoenfelder, Diana Ribas, and Roberto Pelizzola in Lyon.

Making their Grand Prix debut, Alessandrini/Souquet placed 9th at the 2016 Trophée de France. They received the bronze medal at the French Championships.

2018–2019 season 
Souquet-Basiège teamed up with Julia Wagret prior to the season. They placed in the top nine at three Challenger Series events, 2018 CS Lombardia Trophy, 2018 CS Inge Solar Memorial – Alpen Trophy, and 2018 CS Golden Spin of Zagreb. Wagret/Souquet-Basiège also competed at several Senior B competitions.

Wagret/Souquet-Basiège placed fourth at the 2019 French Championships. They concluded their season at the 2019 Winter Universiade, where they finished sixth.

2019–2020 season 
Wagret/Souquet-Basiège placed fifth at 2019 CS U.S. International Figure Skating Classic to open the season. They also placed fifth at 2019 CS Ice Star, earning personal bests in all three segments. Wagret/Souquet-Basiège were assigned to their first Grand Prix event, 2019 Internationaux de France, where they finished ninth.

2020–2021 season 
With the COVID-19 pandemic making international competition difficult, Wagret/Souquet-Basiège were initially assigned to compete at the 2020 Internationaux de France, but it was subsequently cancelled.

2021–2022 season 
Wagret/Souquet-Basiège debuted at the 2021 CS Lombardia Trophy, placing fourteenth.

Programs

With Wagret

With Alessandrini

With Ojardias

Competitive highlights 
GP: Grand Prix; CS: Challenger Series; JGP: Junior Grand Prix

With Wagret

With Alessandrini

With Ojardias

References

External links 
 
 

1994 births
French male ice dancers
Living people
Figure skaters from Paris
Competitors at the 2019 Winter Universiade